"Neighbourhood Freak" is a song by Australian band Swoop and was released in October 1994 as the first single from the group's second studio album The Woxo Principle. It was their first charting single, peaking at number 62 on the ARIA Charts.

The song poled at number 74 in the Triple J Hottest 100, 1994.

Track listings

Charts

References

1994 songs
1994 singles
Swoop (Australian band) songs